Mikaela Wulff (born 24 April 1990 in Helsinki) is a Finnish sailor who participated in the Elliott 6m competition at the 2012 Summer Olympics. She was in a crew led by Silja Lehtinen along with Silja Kanerva and finished in 3rd place, achieving bronze medal.

References

External links
 
 
 

1990 births
Living people
Finnish female sailors (sport)
Olympic sailors of Finland
Olympic bronze medalists for Finland
Olympic medalists in sailing
Sailors at the 2012 Summer Olympics – Elliott 6m
Medalists at the 2012 Summer Olympics
Sportspeople from Helsinki